The Nanaimo mine explosion occurred on May 3, 1887, in Nanaimo, British Columbia killing 150 miners. Only seven miners survived and the mine burned for one full day.

The explosion started deep underground in the Number One Coal Mine after explosives were laid improperly. Although many miners died instantly, others were trapped by the explosion and the fires that followed. Most miners did not die from the primary explosions or the fires, but many actually died from choking on poisonous gas hours after the initial explosions. These men wrote farewell messages in the dust of their shovels. Nearly 150 children lost their fathers and 46 women became widows. Most of the men were settlers from Cornwall, Wales and Yorkshire. A plaque at the foot of Milton Street commemorates the event.

Although past documents put the death toll at 148, researchers have since revised the number to 150, including 53 Chinese workers. Chinese workers were listed in the government inquest and annual report of the Minister of Mines as "Chinamen, names unknown", followed by a tag number. B.C. employers did not have to report the deaths of Chinese employees until 1897. Some accounts suggest that 48 of the 53 miners had the surname of Mah — records may have been destroyed when Nanaimo's Chinatown burned to the ground in 1960. The monument on Milton Street lists the names of white miners, but only the tally number for Chinese miners, who were blamed by many white Nanaimoites for the disaster, claiming they could not read signs or instructions. 

Operated by the Vancouver Coal Company, the Number One mine opened in 1884 at the foot of Milton Street in Nanaimo. Its shafts and tunnels extended under the Nanaimo Harbour to Protection Island, Newcastle Island, and the Nanaimo River. After the explosion, the mine re-opened and produced 18 million tons of coal before permanently closing in 1938.

Gallery

See also
List of coal mines and landmarks in the Nanaimo area
Largest artificial non-nuclear explosions
Protection Island mining disaster

References

External links
 For a list of miners and causes of deaths search Nanaimo Colliery No. 1 for the year 1887 at Nanaimo Community Archives, Mine, Death, and Accident Database 1877-1952

Coal mining disasters in Canada
Explosions in Canada
Disasters in British Columbia
Nanaimo
1887 in Canada
1887 mining disasters
History of Vancouver Island
1887 in British Columbia
Mid Vancouver Island
Explosions in 1887
1887 disasters in Canada